RTZ (Return to Zero) was an American rock band that featured Boston band members Brad Delp and Barry Goudreau. The band was formed in the early 1990s.

History
RTZ began as a collaboration between Boston members Brad Delp and Barry Goudreau around 1989. The original 1987 demo of "Face The Music" (featuring Fergie Frederiksen on vocals) was later made available for download at BarryGoudreau.com. Goudreau and Delp were both part of the original Boston line-up and after Goudreau's departure from the band, they stayed in close contact with Delp contributing to Goudreau's solo album and also to a lesser degree on the Orion the Hunter album.

Around 1989, Delp was on hiatus from Boston and looking to get active in writing again.  He contacted Goudreau about a possible collaboration and RTZ was formed.  Goudreau and Delp brought in keyboardist Brian Maes who was part of the Orion the Hunter touring band, drummer Dave Stefanelli and bass player Tim Archibald.  Maes and Stefanelli had previously worked with producer Nick Lowe in England and Archibald's band New Man had released an album on Epic.

Delp and Goudreau landed a deal with Giant Records and the first RTZ album, titled Return to Zero, was released in 1991. A video was produced for the first single "Face the Music". The band soon hit the road and Delp gave Boston his notice. After touring the US extensively, a video was prepared for the single "Until Your Love Comes Back Around" penned by keyboard player Brian Maes.  The single was very successful and reached #1 in several markets, #26 in the U.S.  Two other tracks, "There's Another Side" and "All You've Got" also got airplay, with the latter reaching #56.

RTZ felt that the band was not getting the attention it deserved by the label and asked to be released from their contract.  As RTZ began to shop for a new label, Delp decided to leave the band and would eventually reunite with Boston for the Walk On tour and to assist in the writing of the associated album.  The other band members decided that it would be impossible to replace Delp and decided to end the band.  The Return to Zero album went out of print until April 2013, although the band later released other material. There were still enough recordings left over from the original recording sessions to create another album.  Barry searched for a new label and eventually found MTM Records.  The recordings were released on September 28, 1998, and the album was titled Lost.

In 2004, Lost and Found was released.  It features previously unreleased music from the band.  In 2005, RTZ released two CDs simultaneously, Lost in America and Found in America under band member Brian Maes' Briola Records label.  The album contains all the same material that was released on Lost, including the song "Dangerous", which was only available on the Japanese release of Lost.  Found in America contains the same material that is on their 2004 release Lost and Found, but includes a bonus live version of the song "Return to Zero".

The Delp and Goudreau album was also released in 2004, and was included as a bonus CD in Lost and Found. It featured RTZ but was released under the name "Delp and Goudreau" and involves a different style of music from RTZ's albums.

In 2007, the band reunited (though with former Boston member Sib Hashian on drums) to release a single called "Rockin' Away". Written in 2006, it celebrated the 30 year anniversary of Boston, and is also an autobiography of Brad Delp's music career. Following Delp's suicide in 2007, the band reunited again to release the single "Set The Songbird Free" as a tribute to Delp, with Maes on vocals. They also performed at the Brad Delp "Come Together" tribute concert in 2008.

This entire line-up (with Hashian on drums, and without Delp) also makes up most of the members of the band Ernie and the Automatics which formed in 2006.

Discography

Studio albums
 Return to Zero (1991)
 Lost (1998)

Compilation albums
 Lost and Found (2004)

Singles

See also
 Boston (band)

References

American rock music groups
Musical groups established in 1989
Musical groups disestablished in 1994